Maximiliano Larrosa, also known as Maxi Larrosa (born 28 March 1992 in Maldonado, Uruguay) is a Uruguayan karateka.

Awards 
  at the 2019 Pan American Games, Lima, Peru
  at the South American Karate Championship, Santa Cruz de la Sierra, Bolivia, 2017
  at the World University Karate Championship, Braga, Portugal, 2016
  at the XXVI South American Karate Championship, Cartagena, Colombia, 2016

References 

1992 births
Living people
People from Maldonado Department
Uruguayan male karateka
Karateka at the 2019 Pan American Games
Pan American Games medalists in karate
Pan American Games bronze medalists for Uruguay
Medalists at the 2019 Pan American Games
Karateka at the 2015 Pan American Games
21st-century Uruguayan people